You, Me and Him (tr. Coffee with Milk) is a 2007 Brazilian short film written and directed by Brazilian director Daniel Ribeiro. The film has won many awards including the Crystal Bear for best short film at the 2008 Berlin International Film Festival.

Plot
Danilo (Daniel Tavares) is about to move out of his parents' house to go live with his boyfriend, Marcos (Diego Torraca), when his parents die unexpectedly in an accident. His plans for the future change and he becomes responsible for his 10‑year-old brother, Lucas (Eduardo Melo).

New bonds are created between these three young men. While brothers Danilo and Lucas need to learn everything they did not know about each other, Marcos tries to find out if there is a place for him in his boyfriend's new family arrangement. In between video games, glasses of milk, pain and disappointment, they all need to learn how to live together.

Cast
 Daniel Tavares as "Danilo"
 Diego Torraca as "Marcos"
 Eduardo Melo as "Lucas"

Festivals and accolades

Brazil
 40º Festival de Brasília do Cinema Brasileiro
 5º Festival de Cinema de Campo Grande
 11ª Mostra de Cinema de Tiradentes
 Cine PE 2008–Festival do Audiovisual
 15º Festival de Cinema e Vídeo de Cuiabá
 Award: Best Director
 5º Festival de Cinema de Maringá
 CINEME-SE 2008–Festival da Experiência do Cinema
 12º Florianópolis Audiovisual Mercosul - FAM 2008
 Award:  VIVO Audiovisual - Melhor Curta Metragem
 31º Festival Guarnicê de Cinema
 1º Festival Paulínia de Cinema
 Award: Best Director
 Award: Best Actor - Eduardo Melo
 Festival de Cinema Agulhas Negras 2008
 19° Festival Internacional de Curtas-Metragens de São Paulo
 TOP 10 - Escolha do Público
 Award:  Moviemobz
 Comunicurtas 2008 - Festival de Cinema de Campina Grande
 Award: Best Short Film
 Award: Best Short Ficcion
 Award: Best Director
 Award: Best Screenplay
 Award: Best Actor - Daniel Tavares
 II For Rainbow
 Award: Actor - Eduardo Melo
 6º Curta Santos
 Award: Best Director
 Festival do Rio 2008
 9º Festival de Penedo
 8ª Goiânia Mostra Curtas

International
 58th Berlin International Film Festival– Germany
 Winner: Crystal Bear for Best Short Film (Generation 14plus)
 48º Festival Internacional de Cine y TV de Cartagena–Colombia
 Special mention
 22º Festival Internacional de Cinema em Guadalajara–Mexico
 26º Festival Cinematográfico Internacional del Uruguay
 20º Rencontres Cinémas d'Amérique Latine de Toulouse - France
 15º Festival Internacional de Jóvenes Realizadores de Granada - Spain
 21ª Semana de Cine de Medina del Campo - Spain
 23rd Torino GLBT Film Festival–Italy
 Winner: Best Short Film- Audience award
 24th Schwulen Filmwoche - Germany
 11th Pink Apple– Switzerland
 Inside Out Film and Video Festival–Canada
 12th Brazilian Film Festival of Miami– United States
 Winner: Best Short Film
 NewFest 2008: New York Lesbian, Gay, Bisexual, & Transgender Film Festival– United States
 32nd Frameline Film Festival: The San Francisco Int’l LGBT Film Festival– United States
 International Film Festival TOFIFEST - Poland
 Philadelphia Int'l Gay and Lesbian Film Festival - United States
 4th InDPanda International Short Film Festival - Hong Kong
 7th Q! Film Festival - Indonesia
 ANONIMUL Int’l Film Festival - Romania
 2008 Palm Springs Int'l Festival of Short Films - United States
 ShortShorts Mexico
 17ème Festival de Biarritz Cinémas et Cultures de l'Amerique Latine - France
 Cardiff's International - Iris Prize Festival 2008 - United Kingdom
 Festival de Cinema de Quito - Cero Latitud - Ecuador
 53rd Corona Cork Film Festival - Ireland
 27th Uppsala International Short Film Festival - Sweden
 38th Molodist - Kyiv International Film Festival - Ukraine
 LesGaiCineMad - Spain
 DIVERSA Film Festival - Argentina

References

External links 
 
 
 
 Film Festival World page
 

2007 films
Brazilian LGBT-related films
Films shot in São Paulo
Brazilian short films
Gay-related films
2007 LGBT-related films
2000s Portuguese-language films